YIG or Yig may refer to:

Organizations
 Your Independent Grocer, a Canadian Grocery store
 YMCA Youth in Government, alternative name for YMCA Youth and Government

Science and technology
 Yttrium iron garnet, a synthetic garnet
 YIG sphere, an yttrium-iron-garnet-based microwave-frequency filter

Various media
Yig (the Father of Serpents), a deity in H.P. Lovecraft's Cthulhu mythos
The Curse of Yig, short story by H.P.Lovecraft and Zealia Bishop
The Curse of Yig (book), collection of stories by Zealia Bishop